Han Ga-in (born Kim Hyun-joo on February 2, 1982) is a South Korean actress. She starred in television series Yellow Handkerchief and Terms of Endearment early in her career, and became a sought-after model in commercials. Her projects in 2012 were hugely successful, with her period drama Moon Embracing the Sun topping the TV ratings chart, and her film Architecture 101 becoming a box office hit.

Early life
Han Ga-in attended Seoul Gusan Elementary School (서울구산초등학교), Sunjung Middle School (선정중학교) and Baehwa Girls' High School (배화여자고등학교). She excelled academically and scored 384 points out of 400 points in the CSAT. On 22 December 2000, while attending high school, Han participated in KBS1 quiz show Challenge Golden Bell and reached the 34th stage. She studied hospitality management at Kyung Hee University; after entering the entertainment industry, she continued her studies part-time and graduated in 2007.

Career
As a high school student, Han Ga-in appeared on KBS's TV show called The Golden Bell Challenge (도전! 골든벨) and was also captured in footage of interviews with other students. Entertainment executives spotted her in the news clip and immediately went to her school to offer her a part. She decided to use her current stage name as she shares a birth name with another actress who debuted earlier than her.

Han debuted in an Asiana Airlines commercial in 2002, and was cast in the KBS2 drama Sunshine Hunting. She subsequently appeared in a supporting role in the popular daily drama Yellow Handkerchief and made her big-screen debut in Once Upon a Time in High School. In 2004, she took on the leading role in Terms of Endearment and won an Excellence award at the KBS Drama Awards.

In 2005, Han acted in Super Rookie,  a satire on Korea's corporate culture and unemployment among the country's younger generation. It drew solid viewership ratings in the 20% range, and won Han the Excellence Award at the MBC Drama Awards. The drama was also reportedly well received by Japanese viewers and contributed to Han's popularity in the country. This was followed by leading roles in Dr. Kkang and Witch Yoo Hee. In the latter drama, Han sported a bob cut as she portrayed a career woman who cared about her appearance and job rather than relationships.

After Witch Yoo Hee wrapped in 2007, Han publicly criticized the director and writers for the drama's poor quality. She went on a three-year hiatus afterwards, merely starring in advertisements. Han struggled to shake the perception that she was only a lovely face and not a professional actor, having only portrayed stereotypical characters, even though she quickly rose to the top of the TV advertising industry's most sought-after faces list.

Mainly categorized as a "CF star," Han wanted to change that misconception with her comeback in 2010. In Bad Guy, she attempted to transform her image as a pure and innocent girl to a materialistic woman who dreams of climbing the social ladder at the expense of others.

2012 was the most successful year of Han's career yet. She first starred in period drama, Moon Embracing the Sun, in which she played the heroine, an amnesiac noblewoman-turned-shaman. The drama not only ranked number one in its time slot throughout its run but achieved a peak recorded viewer rating of 42.2%, thereby earning "national drama" status. This was followed by a leading role in romantic film Architecture 101, which got rave reviews and set a new box-office record as the highest-grossing Korean melodrama. Han also appeared on episode 87 of the popular variety show, Running Man.

Han was managed by J. One Plus Entertainment from 2009 to 2011, and when her contract expired, she signed with Lee Byung-hun's agency, BH Entertainment in December 2012.

In 2018, Han returned to the small screen after six years with mystery thriller Mistress.

In February 2022, 4 years after Mistress, Han returned to television as a host of SBS talk show Circle House. In April 2022, she made a guest appearance in KBS2 reality-variety show 2 Days & 1 Night, in which her husband Yeon Jung-hoon is a fixed cast member.

Personal life
Han married actor Yeon Jung-hoon on April 26, 2005; they first met as co-stars in the 2003 daily drama Yellow Handkerchief. Their wedding attracted much media attention due to the rarity of actresses marrying in their early twenties, at the prime of their careers. Han had a miscarriage in 2014, and later gave birth to a daughter on April 13, 2016. On May 13, 2019, she gave birth to a son.

Filmography

Film

Television series

Television shows

Radio shows

Music video appearances

Awards and nominations

References

External links 
 
 

1982 births
Living people
South Korean television actresses
South Korean film actresses